Pako Alen Lekgari (born 27 December 1987) is a Botswana international footballer who plays for Security Systems, as a left back.

Career
Born in Kayne, Lekgari has played club football for Botswana Meat Commission, Uniao Flamengo Santos, Black Peril, Black Africa, Township Rollers, Jwaneng Galaxy and Security Systems.

He made his international debut for Botswana in 2013.

References

1987 births
Living people
Botswana footballers
Botswana international footballers
Gilport Lions F.C. players
Uniao Flamengo Santos F.C. players
Black Africa S.C. players
Township Rollers F.C. players
Jwaneng Galaxy F.C. players
Association football fullbacks
Botswana expatriate footballers
Botswana expatriate sportspeople in Namibia
Expatriate footballers in Namibia